Scopula heidra is a moth of the family Geometridae. It was described by Hubert Robert Debauche in 1938 and is endemic to the Democratic Republic of the Congo.

References

Moths described in 1938
heidra
Endemic fauna of the Democratic Republic of the Congo
Moths of Africa